The 1999 Miami Hurricanes football team represented the University of Miami during the 1999 NCAA Division I-A football season. It was the Hurricanes' 74th season of football and ninth as a member of the Big East Conference. The Hurricanes were led by fifth-year head coach Butch Davis and played their home games at the Orange Bowl. They finished the season 9–4 overall and 6–1 in the Big East to finish in second place. They were invited to the Gator Bowl where they defeated Georgia Tech, 28-13.

Schedule

Rankings

Personnel

Coaching staff

Roster

Game summaries

Ohio State

Florida A&M

Penn State

East Carolina

Florida State

Boston College

    
    
    
    
    
    
    
    
    

James Jackson 22 Rush, 134 Yds, 3 Rec, 40 Yds

References

Miami
Miami Hurricanes football seasons
Gator Bowl champion seasons
Miami Hurricanes football